Adolf Julius Lindberg (2 August 1878 - 4 July 1953) was a Finnish Lutheran clergyman and politician. He was born in Borgå landskommun, and was a member of the Parliament of Finland from 1913 to 1916 and from 1922 to 1924, representing the Swedish People's Party of Finland (SFP).

References

1878 births
1953 deaths
People from Porvoo
People from Uusimaa Province (Grand Duchy of Finland)
Swedish-speaking Finns
20th-century Finnish Lutheran clergy
Swedish People's Party of Finland politicians
Members of the Parliament of Finland (1913–16)
Members of the Parliament of Finland (1922–24)
University of Helsinki alumni